Laura Harrington (born April 29, 1958) is an American actress and screenwriter.

Harrington is perhaps best known for her role as the main character's sister in the 1993 film What's Eating Gilbert Grape. Previously seen as the character Mrs. Johnson in the cult classic 1984 film The Adventures of Buckaroo Banzai Across the Eighth Dimension, Harrington went on to play a prominent role in the 1986 film Maximum Overdrive, written and directed by horror novelist Stephen King, in which she played the love interest to Emilio Estevez's character.

She had a supporting role in the 1997 film The Devil's Advocate, alongside Keanu Reeves and Al Pacino. Harrington has also appeared in television series including Quantum Leap. She co-wrote the script for the film The Moon and the Sun. However, the script was heavily rewritten by Barry Berman and James Schamus and Harrington was not credited in the final film.

Filmography

Film

Television

References

External links
 
 

1958 births
American film actresses
American television actresses
Living people
Actors from Ann Arbor, Michigan
21st-century American women